L13 ribosomal protein leaders play a role in ribosome biogenesis as part of an autoregulatory mechanism to control the concentration of ribosomal proteins L13. Three structural classes of L13 ribosomal protein leaders were detected by different bioinformatics approaches: in B. subtilis and other low-GC Gram-positive bacteria., in E. coli  and in Bacteroidia. Although these RNAs are expected to perform the same biological function, they do not appear to be structurally related to one another. The E. coli example has been experimentally confirmed, though the experiments are not comprehensive.  The other two leader structures are thus far not based on experimental support.

See also 
Ribosomal protein leader

References

External links 
 

Ribosomal protein leader